Same-sex marriage in Germany has been legal since 1 October 2017. A bill for the legalisation of same-sex marriage passed the Bundestag on 30 June 2017 and the Bundesrat on 7 July. It was signed into law on 20 July by President Frank-Walter Steinmeier and published in the Federal Law Gazette on 28 July 2017. Previously, the governing CDU/CSU had refused to legislate on the issue of same-sex marriage. In June 2017, Chancellor Angela Merkel unexpectedly said she hoped the matter would be considered as a decision of conscience. Consequently, the other parties' leaders organised for a vote to be held in the last week of June during the final legislative session before summer recess. The Bundestag passed the legislation on 30 June by 393 votes to 226, and it went into force on 1 October. Germany was the first country in Central Europe to legalise same-sex marriage, the 15th in Europe overall, and the 23rd worldwide.

Previously, from 2001 until 2017, Germany had recognized registered life partnerships for same-sex couples. The benefits granted by these partnerships were gradually extended by the Federal Constitutional Court throughout several rulings until they provided for most, but not all, of the rights of marriage.

Registered life partnerships

First and second Schröder governments (1998–2005)
The Act on Registered Life Partnerships was a compromise between proponents of same-sex marriage and conservatives from the two major conservative parties, whose MPs' interpretation of marriage excluded gay people. The act established registered life partnerships granting same-sex couples a number of rights enjoyed by married opposite-sex couples. It was drafted by Volker Beck of the Greens and was approved under the First Schröder Cabinet, a coalition government constiting of the Greens and the Social Democratic Party (SPD). The Bundestag approved it in November 2000 with the government parties voting in favour and the opposition CDU/CSU and the Free Democratic Party (FDP) voting against. President Johannes Rau signed the law on 16 February 2001 and it entered into force on 1 August 2001.

On 17 July 2002, the Federal Constitutional Court upheld the act as constitutional. The court found, unanimously, that the process leading to the law's enactment was constitutional. The 8-member court further ruled, with three dissenting votes, that the substance of the law conforms to the Basic Law (Grundgesetz, the German Constitution), and ruled that these partnerships could be granted equal rights to those given to married couples. The initial law had deliberately withheld certain privileges, such as joint adoption and pension rights for widows and widowers, in an effort to observe the "special protection" which the Constitution provides for marriage and the family. The court determined that the "specialness" of the protection was not in the quantity of protection, but in the obligatory nature of this protection, whereas the protection of registered partnerships was at the Bundestag's discretion.

On 12 October 2004, the Registered Life Partnership Law (Revision) Act was passed by the Bundestag, increasing the rights of registered life partners to include, among others, the possibility of stepchild adoption and simpler alimony and divorce rules, but excluding the same tax benefits as in a marriage. The law took effect on 1 January 2005.

First Merkel Government (2005–2009)
In July 2008, the Federal Constitutional Court ruled that a transgender person who transitioned to female, after having been married to a woman for more than 50 years, could remain married to her wife and change her legal gender to female. It gave the Bundestag one year to effect the necessary change in the relevant law.

On 22 October 2009, the Constitutional Court ruled that a man whose employer had given him and his registered partner inferior pension benefits on account of him not being married was entitled to the same benefits he would receive were he and his partner married and of opposite sexes. The court's decision mandated equal rights for same-sex registered couples not just in regard to pension benefits, but in regard to all rights and responsibilities applying to married couples.

Second Merkel Government (2009–2013)
On 25 October 2009, the new CDU/CSU-FDP coalition released its government programme. It stipulated that the tax inequality between same-sex life partners and opposite-sex married couples would be repealed and the Constitutional Court's ruling of 22 October would be codified into law. However, the government programme did not mention adoption rights.

On 17 August 2010, the Federal Constitutional Court ruled that surviving registered partners are entitled to the same inheritance tax rules as surviving spouses. Previously, surviving marital partners paid 7–30% inheritance tax while surviving registered partners paid 17–50%.

On 18 February 2013, the Constitutional Court broadened adoption rights for registered partners. The court ruled that a partner must be allowed to adopt the other partner's adopted child, a so-called "successive adoption", and not only a partner's biological child. However, the government did not bring up a vote in Parliament to change the adoption laws before it adjourned in June 2013. The court gave the Bundestag until 30 June 2014 to change the laws. On 6 June 2013, the Constitutional Court ruled that registered partners should have joint tax filing benefits equal to those of married opposite-sex couples. The Bundestag had to change the law retroactively.

Third Merkel Government (2013–2017)
While the new CDU/CSU-SPD government had to allow successive adoption by June 2014 as required by the 2013 Constitutional Court ruling, the court was expected to rule in 2014 whether registered partners should be allowed to jointly adopt children as well, but dismissed the case in February 2014 on procedural grounds. In March 2014, the coalition government approved a bill to allow successive adoption, with discussion on whether or not to implement full adoption equality. The Bundesrat recommended full adoption equality, and a Bundestag committee held a hearing on the topic. On 22 May, the Bundestag passed the law while rejecting proposals by the Greens for full adoption equality. Another law to grant same-sex couples full tax equality passed unanimously in the Bundestag, finishing the required legal changes following the June 2013 court ruling.

In October 2015, the Bundestag approved a government bill modifying a series of laws concerning registered partnerships. It gave registered partners the same rights as married couples in several legal areas; there were, however, no noteworthy changes. The bill passed the Bundesrat in November 2015.

The ability to enter into a registered life partnership was closed off on 1 October 2017. No further partnerships are granted in Germany, and couples may retain their status as registered partners or convert their union into a recognized marriage.

Partnership statistics
The registered partnership law went into effect on 1 August 2001. By October 2004, 5,000 same-sex couples had registered.

In 2007, there were 15,000 registered couples, two-thirds being male, and in 2010 there were 23,000 couples. In May 2011, 68,268 people reported being in a registered life partnership. As of the end of 2016, 44,000 registered partnerships had been conducted in Germany; approximately 25,000 (56.8%) were between men, while 19,000 were between women (43.2%).

Same-sex marriage

CDU/CSU, the senior member parties of Germany's coalition governments between 2005 and 2021, were historically opposed to the legalisation of same-sex marriage. The Greens, the Social Democratic Party (SPD) and the Left Party support same-sex marriage and voted in June 2012 for a defeated bill to legalise it. The Free Democratic Party (FDP) supports same-sex marriage, though it rejected legislation when they were part of a coalition government with the CDU/CSU between 2009 and 2013. The SPD agreed to oppose same-sex marriage when in government with the CDU/CSU between 2013 and 2017. Most parties made agreement on same-sex marriage a condition for joining a coalition government with the CDU/CSU after the 2017 federal election. Since legalization in October 2017, the CDU/CSU has opposed motions to repeal the same-sex marriage law, and mostly considers the matter "settled".

In German, same-sex marriage is known as gleichgeschlechtliche Ehe or more commonly in public discourse as Ehe für alle, meaning "marriage for all".

Second Merkel Government (2009–2013)
The opposition Greens released a draft same-sex marriage law in June 2009. In March 2010, the Senate of Berlin announced its intention to introduce a same-sex marriage bill in the Bundesrat, the federal representation of the German states. According to the Senate, this law would best fit the Constitutional Court's ruling that same-sex couples must be treated equally to heterosexual couples. The Bundesrat rejected the law in September 2010. Only Berlin, Brandenburg, Bremen and North Rhine-Westphalia voted in favour of the same-sex marriage bill; the other 12 states did not. In June 2011, the Senate of Hamburg, following CDU losses in state elections around the country, also announced its intention to introduce a same-sex marriage bill in the Bundesrat.

On 28 June 2012, a Greens motion to legalise same-sex marriage was defeated in the Bundestag by a vote of 309 to 260 with 12 abstentions. The motion was meant to give parity to same-sex couples in adoption and tax purposes. CDU/CSU and FDP members voted against the proposal, while the opposition parties (Social Democratic Party, Greens, and The Left) supported it.

On 22 March 2013, the Bundesrat passed a bill proposed by 5 states (Hamburg, Lower Saxony, North Rhine-Westphalia, Rhineland-Palatinate and Schleswig-Holstein) to open marriage to same-sex couples. The bill was sent to the Bundestag for a vote; however, the ruling coalition was still the same as in 2012 when the previous proposal was defeated.

Third Merkel Government (2013–2017)
Federal elections were held on 22 September 2013, after which a new government coalition was formed. The new Bundestag, inaugurated on 22 October, again consisted of a theoretical majority of parties in favour of same-sex marriage (SPD, The Left and the Greens). The Left immediately introduced a bill to legalise same-sex marriage, but the SPD did not support it in order to not jeopardise negotiations on government formation. Even though the SPD had campaigned on "100% equality" for LGBT people, the coalition agreement between the CDU/CSU and the SPD did not contain any significant change regarding LGBT rights. The Left's bill had its first reading on 19 December 2013 and was subsequently sent to the Legal Affairs Committee for consideration.

On 5 June 2015, nine states (Baden-Württemberg, Brandenburg, Bremen, Hamburg, Lower Saxony, North Rhine-Westphalia, Rhineland-Palatinate, Schleswig-Holstein and Thuringia) submitted a same-sex marriage bill to the Bundesrat. The legislation had its first reading on 12 June 2015. In the Bundestag, the Greens submitted another bill on 10 June 2015. It had its first reading on 18 June. On 25 September 2015, the Bundesrat voted to approve the bill proposed by the nine states. The bill moved to the Bundestag where the governing parties (CDU/CSU and SPD) blocked the consideration of all three pending same-sex marriage bills.

On 14 August 2016, despite the lack of legal recognition for same-sex marriages, two men were married at St. Mary's Church in Berlin by two Protestant pastors, the first same-sex marriage performed in a German church.

In March 2017, the SPD, the junior partner in the coalition government, announced they would press the CDU to legalise same-sex marriage in the face of overwhelming public support. The leader of the SPD in the Bundestag, Thomas Oppermann, said his party would introduce a bill, in addition to the long-pending bills of the Greens, The Left and the one referred from the Bundesrat, but eventually did not do so. On 20 June 2017, the Federal Constitutional Court rejected an application by the Greens for an injunction ordering the Legal Affairs Committee to send bills legalising same-sex marriage to lawmakers for a vote in Parliament's last pre-election session.
 
On 17 June 2017, the Greens pledged not to participate in any governing coalition after the 2017 elections unless the legalisation of same-sex marriage was part of the agreement. On 24 June, FDP leader Christian Lindner said that he would recommend that his party makes a similar commitment, and the following day the SPD made a similar pledge.

Bundestag vote and Bundesrat approval (2017)

In late June 2017, whilst answering audience questions at a public forum in Berlin, Chancellor Angela Merkel unexpectedly stated that she hoped the question of same-sex marriage would be considered as a decision of conscience. This was widely interpreted to mean that she would allow a conscience vote in the Bundestag on the matter, without party whip control by the Union parties. Shortly after her statement, several politicians, including SPD leader Martin Schulz, pressured for a vote to be held in the last week of June during the final legislative session before summer recess. On 27 June, both Union parties (CDU and CSU) announced that they would allow their lawmakers a conscience vote, although they opposed a vote being held before the federal election. The SPD de facto breached the coalition agreement and planned on voting with the opposition parties to legalise same-sex marriage. On 28 June, SPD, Green, and Left members of the Legal Affairs Committee voted to schedule a plenary vote on the bill proposed by the Bundesrat in 2015, outvoting CDU/CSU members. The Greens and The Left withdrew their own respective bills.

On 30 June, the Bundestag debated and passed the bill by 393–226 with 4 abstentions and 7 absentees. Merkel herself, whose change of position had led to the vote being held, voted against the legislation, but said she hoped the result "not only promotes respect between the different opinions but also brings more social cohesion and peace". On 7 July, the Bundesrat approved the bill without a vote because there were no requests for changes. The bill was signed into law on 20 July 2017 by President Frank-Walter Steinmeier. The law was published on 28 July in the Bundesgesetzblatt and came into force the first day of the third month after publication (i.e. 1 October 2017). Hundreds of same-sex couples were married all over Germany that day, with the first same-sex wedding taking place in Schöneberg, Berlin between Karl Kreile and Bodo Mende.

The same-sex marriage law was short; it added the following sentence to Article 1353 of the Bürgerliches Gesetzbuch: "Marriage may be entered into for life by two persons of different sex or of the same sex."

Several legal experts, including MPs and party leaders, raised doubts about the legality of the law, with former President of the Federal Constitutional Court Hans-Jürgen Papier arguing that same-sex marriage is inconsistent with previous definitions of marriage espoused by the court. Article 6(1) of the Constitution places "marriage and family" under the "special protection of the state order". An amendment to the Constitution requires a two-thirds majority in both chambers of Parliament. These concerns were dismissed by Federal Justice Minister Heiko Maas, who argued that Article 6(1) neither defines the term marriage nor rules out a wider definition.

Following the passage of the law, the Bavarian Government and the Alternative for Germany (AfD) party both said they would consider petitioning the court for a judicial review. However, the AfD lacked legal standing to bring a challenge, as it was not part of the federal government or any state government, nor did it have any representation in the Bundestag, and it was far away from reaching the necessary quarter of Bundestag members in the coming election. On 6 March 2018, the Bavarian Government announced it would not challenge the law, after commissioned assessments found its chances to be successful as low.

In September 2018, nearly a year after legalization, the AfD introduced a motion to abolish same-sex marriage. The measure was rejected in the Bundestag on 11 October, with every other political party opposing the motion. Several Green and CDU/CSU lawmakers instead congratulated the thousands of same-sex couples who had married in Germany in the past year, while other MPs criticised the AfD for their proposal, calling it "undemocratic", "wrong", "a cheap political trick at the expense of free society" or even "lazy as hell". In June 2019, the AfD re-introduced a motion to repeal the same-sex marriage law in both the Legal Affairs Committee and the Family Committee. The proposal was rejected by every other political party. The CDU/CSU stated that "the constitutional concept of marriage is open to same-sex couples". The Social Democrats criticized the AfD for trying to "reopen a completed constitutional debate", while the FDP criticized that a renewed marriage ban for same-sex couples would "reduce their freedom". The Left considered the AfD draft to be a "deliberate provocation aimed at denying equal rights to sexual minorities", and the Greens pointed out that there is "broad political and social majority" support for same-sex marriage.

In September 2018, the AfD presented a motion in the Landtag of Schleswig-Holstein to force the state government to challenge the same-sex marriage law at the Federal Constitutional Court. The motion was opposed by every other political party.

In December 2018, the German Parliament passed legislation amending several other laws to reflect the legalisation of same-sex marriage.

Marriage statistics 
According to the Federal Statistical Office of Germany, up to 65,000 same-sex marriages had taken place in Germany by the end of 2021; about half were conversions from registered partnerships.

680 same-sex couples married in Berlin from October to the end of December 2017; 181 in Tempelhof-Schöneberg, 100 in Charlottenburg-Wilmersdorf and 97 in Friedrichshain-Kreuzberg, while the remaining couples married in the 9 other boroughs. During these three months, same-sex marriages accounted for 18.4% of all marriages performed in Berlin.

168 same-sex marriages were performed in Stuttgart from October to December 2017, with most being conversions from registered partnerships. In Mannheim, 135 same-sex couples were married between October 2017 and February 2018, with all but 16 of these marriages being conversions from registered partnerships. In Freiburg im Breisgau, 46 same-sex couples had married by February 2018.

By the end of March 2018, more than 1,000 same-sex marriages had taken place in Berlin (four boroughs did not publish their marriage statistics, leaving incomplete data), 900 in Hamburg, 644 in Cologne, 477 in Munich, 216 in Frankfurt, 192 in Düsseldorf, 180 in Dortmund and 158 in Hannover. Most were conversions from partnerships.

In the state of Berlin, 2,540 same-sex marriages were performed between 1 October 2017 and 31 December 2018, constituting 16.2% of the total 15,660 marriages. Of these, 1,551 (61%) were converted registered life partnerships; 1,637 (64%) were between two men, while the remaining 903 (36%) were between two women. In the state of Brandenburg, 903 same-sex marriages were performed in the same time period, constituting 5.9% of the total 15,440 marriages. 550 (61%) were converted registered life partnerships; 481 (53%) were between two women and 422 (47%) were between two men.

Religious performance
The largest religious organisations in Germany are the Evangelical Church in Germany and the Roman Catholic Church. A 2016 survey from the German General Social Survey showed that 30.5% of German citizens were Catholic, 29.6% were members of the Evangelical Church and 32.4% had no religious affiliation.

The Evangelical Church consists of twenty Lutheran, Reformed and United Protestant regional churches, encompassing the vast majority of Germany's Protestants. All twenty churches allow the blessing of same-sex relationships. Several also perform same-sex marriages in their places of worship: the Evangelical Church in the Rhineland (2016), the Protestant Church in Baden (2016), the Evangelical Church in Berlin, Brandenburg and Silesian Upper Lusatia (2016), the Evangelical Reformed Church in Germany (2017), the Evangelical Church of Bremen (2018), the Evangelical Church of Hesse Electorate-Waldeck (2018), the Evangelical Lutheran Church in Oldenburg (2018), the Protestant Church in Hesse and Nassau (2019), the Evangelical-Lutheran Church of Hanover (2019), the Evangelical Church of the Palatinate (2019), the Church of Lippe (2019), the Evangelical Lutheran Church in Northern Germany (2019), the Evangelical Church of Westphalia (2020) and the Evangelical Lutheran Church in Brunswick (2022). Marriages of same-sex couples are entered into the official church register. Pastors are under no obligation to perform same-sex marriages if this would violate their personal beliefs. The Evangelical Church in Central Germany allows same-sex marriages to be performed in its churches but only if the local municipality agrees.

Although the Catholic Church officially opposes same-sex marriages, several Catholic priests have been secretly blessing same-sex relationships for years, notably in the Roman Catholic Diocese of Aachen. Several bishops have expressed their support for the blessings of same-sex relationships, including bishops Helmut Dieser, Franz-Josef Hermann Bode, Peter Kohlgraf, Georg Bätzing and Heinrich Timmerevers. In May 2021, in response to the Vatican reiterating a ban on blessing same-sex unions, some 120 priests decided to publicly defy the ban and bless several couples. Among them, Father Jan Korditschke decided to bless a member in his congregation whose partner had recently passed away, stating "How can you not bless - sorry, I'm getting emotional - a person in mourning after a long-term relationship? Should I say you should be grateful you got rid of this sinful love?". A 2015 survey conducted by the Free University of Berlin and the University of Münster showed that 70% of German Catholics supported church blessings for same-sex relationships.

The synod of the Catholic Diocese of the Old Catholics in Germany voted in November 2021 to bless same-sex marriages in its churches. The church had already allowed for the blessing of same-sex registered partnerships since 2003.

In March 2023, it was reported that from 2026 within the Frankfurt region of Germany the Catholic church will perform same-sex blessings - that go against the Vatican.

Public opinion
In December 2006, a poll conducted by Angus-Reid Global Monitor, seeking public attitudes on economic, political, and social issues for member states of the European Union, found that Germany ranked seventh supporting same-sex marriage with 52% popular support. German support for same-sex marriage was above the European Union average of 44%.

In January 2013, a poll conducted by YouGov found that German support for same-sex marriage was 66%, with 24% opposed and 10% undecided. Support for adoption by same-sex couples was 59%, with 31% opposed and 11% undecided. A survey conducted the following month by RTL Television and Stern magazine found that 74% of Germans were supportive of same-sex marriage, with 23% against. Support was recorded to be strongest among Green and Social Democratic (SPD) voters, but even among voters of Chancellor Angela Merkel's governing Christian Democrats (CDU) almost two-thirds were in favour.

A May 2013 Ipsos poll found that 67% of respondents were in favour of same-sex marriage and another 12% supported other forms of recognition for same-sex couples. A poll conducted that same month by Ifop showed that 74% of Germans supported allowing same-sex couples to marry and adopt children.

According to an October 2013 poll by TNS Emnid, 70% supported full legal equality of registered partnerships and marriage.

According to a May 2015 poll by YouGov, 65% of Germans supported same-sex marriage (by party: 57% of CDU/CSU voters, 79% of SPD voters, 68% of The Left voters and 94% of Green voters), while 28% opposed allowing same-sex couples to marry and 7% were undecided. Support rose to 75% among 18–24-year-olds, but fell to 60% among those aged 55 and over. By religion, support was 64% among Catholics and 63% among Protestants. Support for adoption by same-sex couples was 57%, with 35% opposed and 8% undecided.

The 2015 Eurobarometer found that 66% of Germans thought same-sex marriage should be allowed throughout Europe, while 29% were opposed.

A May 2015 poll by TNS Emnid found that 64% of Germans supported same-sex marriage (by party: 63% of CDU/CSU voters, 77% of SPD voters, 63% of FDP voters, 62% of The Left voters, 89% of Green voters and 14% of AfD voters), while 31% were opposed and 5% were undecided. A poll conducted the following month by INSA showed that 65% of Germans supported same-sex marriage (by party: 58% of CDU/CSU voters, 75% of SPD voters, 72% of The Left voters, 79% of Green voters, 65% of FDP voters, and 42% of AfD voters).

In January 2017, a study by Germany's Federal Anti-Discrimination Agency indicated that 83% of Germans were in favour of same-sex marriage.

A June 2017 poll found that 73% of Germans supported same-sex marriage, including 95% of Green voters, 82% of SPD voters, 81% of The Left voters, 64% of CDU/CSU voters, 63% of FDP voters, and 55% of AfD voters.

A Pew Research Center poll, conducted between April and August 2017 and published in May 2018, showed that 75% of Germans supported same-sex marriage, 23% were opposed and 2% did not know or refused to answer. When divided by religion, 86% of religiously unaffiliated people, 82% of non-practicing Christians and 53% of church-attending Christians supported same-sex marriage. Opposition was 15% among 18–34-year-olds.

The 2019 Eurobarometer found that 84% of Germans thought same-sex marriage should be allowed throughout Europe, while 12% were opposed.

See also
Marriage in Germany
LGBT rights in Germany
LGBT rights in the European Union
Recognition of same-sex unions in Europe

Notes

References

External links
 Act on Registered Life Partnerships, Gesetze im Internet (in English)
 Gesetz zur Einführung des Rechts auf Eheschließung für Personen gleichen Geschlechts, Federal Ministry of Justice (in German)

LGBT rights in Germany
Germany
2017 in LGBT history
Marriage in Germany
Third Merkel cabinet